J. Teddy Garces (born September 12, 1974) is an American film, television and stage actor, best known for his portrayal of Bruiser in the web series The Guild and Julian in Ted Sampon: Househusband.  He was born Joseph Teddy Garces at St. Lukes Hospital in Manhattan, New York City, to a Dominican father Joseph Garces and a Dominican mother (internationally recognized poet) Yvelisse Fanith.

In 2011 Teddy filmed the first few episodes of his web series Sound Advice On The Web in which he casts, writes and plays in. Teddy plays Dr. Theodore W. Evington III, a dysfunctional therapist who gives his clients raw and uncensored "Sound Advice". The slogan for the show is "He doesn’t mean to be rude , He just is...".  Web publicity and social media were given over to audio producer and web publicist Chris Pope of the Tech Jives network and Social Stars Web. Casting in this film includes some of the cast from The Guild such as director Sean Michael Becker, Teal Sherer, Jeff Lewis, as well as some of the behind the scenes crew.

Filmography

References

External links
 
 Audio interview with Chris Pope and Mark Eoff of Tech Barbarians

Living people
1974 births
Male actors from New York City
American male television actors
American male web series actors
21st-century American male actors
American people of Dominican Republic descent